The 2015 Red Bull Air Race of Rovinj was the third round of the 2015 Red Bull Air Race World Championship season, the tenth season of the Red Bull Air Race World Championship. The event was held in Rovinj, a coastal city in Croatia.

The race was won by Austria's Hannes Arch by 0.071 seconds from Martin Šonka, with Matt Hall in third, 0.148 seconds down on Arch's time.

Master Class

Qualification

Round of 14

 Pilot received 2 seconds in penalties.
 Pilot received 3 seconds in penalties.
 Pilot received 4 seconds in penalties.

Round of 8

 Pilot received 2 seconds in penalties.

Final 4

Challenger Class

Results

Standings after the event

Master Class standings

Challenger Class standings

 Note: Only the top five positions are included for both sets of standings.

References

External links

|- style="text-align:center"
|width="35%"|Previous race:2015 Red Bull Air Race of Chiba
|width="30%"|Red Bull Air Race2015 season
|width="35%"|Next race:2015 Red Bull Air Race of Budapest
|- style="text-align:center"
|width="35%"|Previous race:2014 Red Bull Air Race of Rovinj
|width="30%"|Red Bull Air Race of Rovinj
|width="35%"|Next race:none
|- style="text-align:center"

Rovinj
Red Bull Air Race World Championship